L'Homme au doigt ("The Man with the Finger"; also called Pointing Man or Man Pointing) is a 1947 bronze sculpture by Alberto Giacometti, that became the most expensive sculpture ever when it sold for US$141.3 million on 11 May 2015.

Giacometti made six casts of the work plus one artist's proof. Pointing Man is in the collections of New York's Museum of Modern Art, London's Tate Gallery, and the Des Moines Art Center. One of the others is also in a museum, and the rest are in foundation collections or owned privately.

L’homme au doigt sold for $126 million, or $141.3 million with fees, in Christie's 11 May 2015 Looking Forward to the Past sale in New York, a record for a sculpture at auction. The work had been in Sheldon Solow's private collection for 45 years.

Christie's called it a "rare masterpiece", and "Giacometti’s most iconic and evocative sculpture", and estimated that it would sell "in the region of $130 million". Christie's also noted that the cast in their auction is believed to be the only one that Giacometti "painted by hand in order to heighten its expressive impact".

Another Giacometti work, L'Homme qui marche I, had also been the most expensive sculpture ever sold at auction, when it sold for £65 million (US$104.3 million) at Sotheby's, London on 3 February 2010.

See also
 List of most expensive sculptures

References

Sculptures by Alberto Giacometti
1947 sculptures
Bronze sculptures
Sculptures of the Museum of Modern Art (New York City)
Sculptures of the Tate galleries
Bronze sculptures in New York City
Bronze sculptures in the United Kingdom
2015 in art